David McNiven Garner (26 November 1928 – 13 May 2016) was notable as a published research physicist, with a focus in physical oceanography and ocean circulation.

History 
Garner attended New York University from 1959 to 1962, where he graduated with a PhD in Physics on 22 October 1962.  Dr. Garner returned to New Zealand in 1962, joining a team of scientists that founded the New Zealand Oceanographic Institute of the Department of Scientific and Industrial Research (today known as National Institute of Water and Atmospheric Research), then located in Hobson Street, Wellington, New Zealand.

Garner immigrated with his family to Canada in 1968, as a physical oceanographer in the ocean circulation department at the Bedford Institute of Oceanography in Nova Scotia, Canada from February 1968 to July 1971, where his topics of research included effects around the Mid-Atlantic Ridge.  He worked extensively on the oceanographic research vessels CSS Dawson and CSS Hudson (Canadian Scientific Ship, painted Survey Ship white, and run by the Bedford Institute of Oceanography), which today is the CCGS Hudson.  His voyages included a portion of the first ever circumnavigation of North and South America by the CSS Hudson in 1970, on which he was a watch keeper, not a scientist.

Garner returned with his family to New Zealand in 1971, where he was a senior lecturer at the University of Auckland Physics Department from approximately July 1971 to 1974, in Auckland, New Zealand.  During his tenure, he worked on the physical oceanographic aspects of an ecological impact report by the university for Shell BP Todd Maui in their offshore drilling operations.

Scientific Publications 
 1952: Seasonal Variation in the Aurora Australis, NZ J Sci Tech
 1953: Physical Characteristics of Inshore surface waters between Cook Strait and Banks Peninsula, New Zealand, N.Z. J. Sci. Tech. B35: 239–46.
 1957: Hydrology of Chatham Rise, in N.Z. Department of Scientific and Industrial Research Bulletin 122: 18–27
 1959: The Sub-tropical Convergence in New Zealand Coastal Waters.  New Zealand Journal of Geology and Geophysics. 2: 315–37
 1959: A section of Carbon-14 activities of sea water between 9 deg south and 66 deg south in the south-west Pacific Ocean.  New Zealand Journal of Geology and Geophysics
 1960: Hydrology of New Zealand Coastal Waters 1955.  N.Z. Department of Scientific and Industrial Research Bulletin 138.
 1962: Biological results of the Chatham Islands 1954 expedition: Part 5 Bergquist, PR; Pike, RB; Hurley, DE; Ralph, PM; Garner, DM  New Zealand Oceanographic Institute Memoir [N.Z. Oceanogr. Inst. Mem.]. no. 13, 60 pp. 1961.
 1962: Analysis of hydrological observations in the New Zealand region, 1874–1955.
 1962: The average horizontal wind driven mass transport of the Atlantic for February as obtained by numerical methods. Scientific report under contract Nonr 285(03), New York University, College of Engineering, Research Division.
 1962: Some Studies On The Ocean Circulation Dissertation in the Department of Meteorology and Oceanography submitted to the faculty of the Graduate School of Arts and Science in partial fulfillment of the requirements for the degree of Doctor of Philosophy at New York University.
 1965: Hydrology of New Zealand offshore waters.
 1967: Hydrology of the Hikurangi Trench region. Mere. N.Z. Oceanogr. Inst. 39, Wellington, 177 pp.
 1967: Hydrology of the south-east Tasman Sea.
 1967: The fauna of the Ross Sea. Part 5. General accounts, station lists, and benthic ecology.  Bullivant, JS; Dearborn, JH; Garner, DM  New Zealand Oceanographic Institute Memoir [N.Z. Oceanogr. Inst. Mem.]. no. 32, 77 pp. 1967.
 1969: The geopotential topography of the ocean surface around New Zealand. N.Z.J. Mar. Freshwater Res., 3, 209 219.
 1969: The Mid-Atlantic Ridge near 45 degrees N:(4) Water properties in the median valley.  Garner, D.M., Ford, W.L.  Canadian Journal of Earth Sciences, 1969, v.6 pp. 1359–1363
 1969: Vertical surface acceleration in a wind-generated sea. Garner, D.M.  Deutsche hydrographische zeitschrift, 1969, v.22 pp. 163–168
 1970: Hydrological studies in the New Zealand region 1966 and 1967. Oceanic hydrology north-west of New Zealand. Hydrology of the north-east Tasman Sea. 49 p. 
 1970: Vertical surface acceleration in a wind-generated sea.  Ocean Dynamics Volume 22, Number 4 / July 1969.  See also  Deutsche hydrographische Zeitschrift 22(4): 163–8
 1972: Flow through the Charlie-Gibbs Fracture Zone, Mid-Atlantic Ridge.  Garner, D.M.  Canadian Journal of Earth Sciences, 1972, v. 9, pp. 116–121
 1973: The meridional distribution of silicate in the western Atlantic Ocean.  Mann, C.R., Coote, A.R., Garner, D.M.  Deep-Sea Research and Oceanographic Abstracts, 1973, v.20, pp. 791–801

Personal 
After leaving secondary school in 1946, David could not get into University because of a preference for World War II returned servicemen, so he got a job for a year (1946–47) on the Meteorological Sounding Team Canterbury Project on radar meteorology with the Department of Scientific and Industrial Research, based at the Ashburton Aerodrome.  The New Zealand National Film Unit made a short film of the activities for its Weekly Review which showed in cinemas as a short subject.  The film shows David getting into an Avro Anson, and working with a kite on the back of a truck, and a trawler.

David attended Stages I and II at Canterbury College, then moved to Wellington where he graduated BSc and MSc from the Victoria College of the University of New Zealand.  After graduation David was employed doing sunspot research at the Carter Observatory in Kelburn, Wellington, from where he published his first scientific paper.

David Garner was the father of three children by Edna Jean Garner: including Mary Ann Garner, John David Garner and Steven James Garner.  His wife was Kirsty Garner. David Garner died 13 May 2016.

References

1928 births
2016 deaths
New Zealand physicists
Academic staff of the University of Auckland
Victoria University of Wellington alumni
New York University alumni
Physical oceanographers